Michael Arthur Ledeen (born August 1, 1941) is an American historian, and neoconservative foreign policy analyst. He is a former consultant to the United States National Security Council, the United States Department of State, and the United States Department of Defense. He held the Freedom Scholar chair at the American Enterprise Institute where he was a scholar for twenty years and now holds the similarly named chair at the Foundation for Defense of Democracies. He was very close to Antonio Martino.

Academic career
Ledeen holds a Ph.D. in History and Philosophy from the University of Wisconsin–Madison where he studied under the historian George Mosse. His doctoral dissertation eventually became Universal Fascism: The Theory and Practice of the Fascist International, 1928–1936, first published in 1972. The book explored Italian leader Benito Mussolini's efforts to create a Fascist international in the late 1920s and early 1930s. Ledeen taught at Washington University in St. Louis but left after being denied tenure. Some faculty indicated that questions about the "quality of his scholarship" and about whether or not Ledeen had "used the work of somebody else without proper credit" were issues, although some also noted that "the 'quasi-irregularity' at issue didn't warrant the negative vote on tenure."

Ledeen subsequently moved to Rome, where he was hired as the Rome correspondent for The New Republic and was named a visiting professor at the University of Rome for two years until 1977. In Rome, Ledeen worked with Italian historian Renzo De Felice, who greatly influenced Ledeen, drawing a distinction between "fascism-regime" and "fascism-movement." Ledeen's political views developed to stress "the urgency of combating centralized state power and the centrality of human freedom" Ledeen continued his studies in Italian Fascism with a study of the takeover of Fiume by Italian irredentist forces under Gabriele d'Annunzio, who Ledeen argued was the prototype for Mussolini.

Billygate 
In the 1980 lead up to the US presidential election, Ledeen, along with Arnaud de Borchgrave, wrote a series of articles published in The New Republic and elsewhere about Jimmy Carter's brother, Billy Carter's contacts with the Muammar al-Gaddafi regime in Libya. Ledeen testified before a Senate subcommittee that he believed that Billy Carter had met with and been paid off by Yasser Arafat of the Palestinian Liberation Organization.

Five years later, in 1985, a Wall Street Journal investigation suggested that the series of Billygate articles written by Ledeen were part of a larger disinformation campaign intended to influence the outcome of that year's presidential election. According to the reporting, Francesco Pazienza, an officer of the Italian intelligence agency SISMI, alleged that Ledeen was paid $120,000 for his work on Billygate and other projects. Pazienza and Ledeen were very active in disinformation efforts. At SISMI, Pazienza stated, Ledeen warranted a coded identification: Z-3. Pazienza was later tried and convicted in absentia for using "extortion and fraud to obtain embarrassing facts about Billy Carter".

The Bulgarian connection 
Ledeen worked for the Italian military intelligence agency SISMI in 1980 providing "risk assessment", and consulting on extradition matters between Italy and the United States. It was during his time in Italy which Ledeen came out in his belief in the "Bulgarian connection" conspiracy theory concerning Grey Wolves member Mehmet Ali Ağca's 1981 attempt to assassinate Pope John Paul II. The theory has since been attacked by various authors and journalists, including Washington Post reporter Michael Dobbs, who initially believed the story as well. The theory was adopted in 2005 by the Italian Mitrokhin Commission. According to Craig Unger, "With Ronald Reagan newly installed in the White House, the so-called Bulgarian Connection made perfect Cold War propaganda. Michael Ledeen was one of its most vocal proponents, promoting it on TV and in newspapers all over the world."

Work in the United States 
In the early 1980s, Ledeen appeared before the newly established Senate Subcommittee on Security and Terrorism, alongside former CIA director William Colby, author Claire Sterling and former Newsweek editor Arnaud de Borchgrave. Both Ledeen and de Borchgrave worked for the Center for Strategic and International Studies at Georgetown University at the time. All four testified that they believed the Soviet Union had provided for material support, training and inspiration for various terrorist groupings.

Ledeen was involved in the Iran–Contra affair as a consultant of National Security Advisor Robert C. McFarlane. Ledeen vouched for Iranian intermediary Manucher Ghorbanifar. According to Adnan Khashoggi in 1985, Ghorbanifar was the head of Iranian Prime Minister Mir Hussein Mousavi's European intelligence and Ledeen was aware of this. In addition, he met with Israeli Prime Minister Shimon Peres, officials of the Israeli Foreign Ministry, and the CIA to arrange meetings with high-ranking Iranian officials, whereby Iranians supported by the US would be given weapons by Israel, and would proceed to negotiate with Hizbollah for the release of hostages in Lebanon. Ledeen's own version of the events is published in his book, Perilous Statecraft.

Yellowcake forgery allegations 

During the summer of 2001, Alain Chouet and others with France's DGSE investigate an alleged deal known later as Nigergate in which Iraq was trying to obtain yellowcake from a country in Africa and, by May and June 2002, they investigate any connection with Niger but find that the rumors are entirely false. Furthermore, in July 2002, the Italian SISMI and the United States CIA are informed by the French DGSE that Rocco Martino, a former Italian intelligence agent, is trying to pass fake documents about Iraq obtaining yellowcake from Niger. However, the SISMI report that a lady, who is controlled by SISMI's Antonio Nucera, in the Niger embassy at Rome presents the fake documents in July 2002. Later, in March 2003, George Tenet incorrectly stated that Iraq, which had large quantities of yellowcake, was obtaining yellowcake from Niger.

According to a September 2004 article by Joshua Micah Marshall, Laura Rozen, and Paul Glastris in Washington Monthly: "The first meeting occurred in Rome in December, 2001. It included Franklin, Rhode, and another American, the neoconservative writer and operative Michael Ledeen, who organized the meeting. (According to UPI, Ledeen was then working for Undersecretary of Defense Douglas Feith as a consultant.) Also in attendance was Ghorbanifar and a number of other Iranians."

Colleagues Andrew McCarthy and Mark R. Levin have defended Ledeen, writing: "Up until now, the fiction recklessly spewed by disgruntled intelligence-community retirees and their media enablers—some of whom have conceded that the claim is based on zero evidence—has been that Michael had something to do with the forged Italian documents that, according to the Left's narrative, were the basis for President Bush's "lie" in the 2003 State of the Union Address that Saddam Hussein had obtained yellowcake uranium (for nuclear-weapons construction) in Africa."

Iraq War advocacy
During the 1990s, Ledeen was active in supporting the ousting of Saddam Hussein from Iraq. He was known as one of The Vulcans who also included John Bolton, Douglas Feith, Richard Perle, Paul Wolfowitz, Donald Rumsfeld, and David Wurmser who signed an "An Open Letter to the President" to lobby Bill Clinton to remove Hussein from office.

Regarding the "pre-emptive" invasion of Iraq, in 2002 Ledeen criticized the views of former National Security Adviser Brent Scowcroft, writing:

Ledeen's statements prior to the start of the Iraq war such as "desperately needed and long overdue war against Saddam Hussein" and "dire need to invade Iraq" caused Glenn Greenwald to label his later statement that he "opposed the military invasion of Iraq before it took place" to be an "outright lie". However, Ledeen maintains these statements are consistent since: "I opposed the military invasion of Iraq before it took place and I advocated—as I still do—support for political revolution in Iran as the logical and necessary first step in the war against the terror masters."

Views on Iran
Ledeen is a long-time foe of the Islamic regime of Iran.  He believed that invading the country and regime change in Iran should have been the first priority in the "war on terror" in 2003 rather than Iraq. He believes that "everything traces back to Tehran" and that Iran manipulates both sides of the Shi'ite-Sunni conflict, leading reviewer Peter Beinart to note that his "effort to lay virtually every attack by Muslims against Americans at Tehran's feet takes him into rather bizarre territory." The New York Times describes Ledeen's views as "everything traces back to Tehran". Ledeen's phrase, "faster, please" has become a signature meme in Ledeen's writings (it is currently the title of his blog on the Pajamas Media website) and is often referenced by neoconservative writers advocating a more forceful and broader "war on terror." In 1979, Ledeen was one of the first Western writers to argue that Ayatollah Ruhollah Khomeini was a "clerical fascist", and that while it was legitimate to criticize the Shah's regime, if Khomeini seized power in Iran the Iranian people would suffer an even greater loss of freedom and women would be deprived of political and social rights. He presently believes that "No one in the West has yet supported Iranian democratic organizations" and that "aggressive support for those Iranians who wish to be free" would most likely work in ending the clerical government.

According to Justin Raimondo, Ledeen "holds up Bill Clinton and Madeleine Albright as patsies for Khomeini—who supposedly believed that the Ayatollah overthrew Shah Reza Pahlavi because the Iranian government was 'excessively repressive and intolerant.' While it would not do to come right out and deny the savagery of the Shah's legendary SAVAK secret police, Ledeen informs us that, under the monarch's beneficent rule, 'Iran had become too modern, too tolerant—especially of women and of other religious faiths—and too self-indulgent. The shah had Westernized Iran'—except, perhaps, in his prisons, where the ancient methods of torture were routinely employed on dissidents of all sorts."

Ledeen is currently against both an invasion of Iran or air-strikes within the country. He has argued that the latter may eventually become necessary if negotiations with the Iranian government fail, but it would only be the least bad option of many options and it would lead to many negative unforeseen consequences. The New York Times has called Ledeen's skepticism towards military action against Iran surprising given his opposition to the regime.

In July 2016 Ledeen co-authored with Lt. General Michael T. Flynn, at the time Donald Trump's national-security adviser, The Field of Fight: How We Can Win the Global War Against Radical Islam and Its Allies. Flynn and Ledeen constructed a narrative in which the world is at war with a "great evil" and Iran is the central player on the enemy side.

Controversial theories
Ledeen also believed that Iran is the main backer of the insurgency in Iraq and even supported the al-Qaida network formerly led by al-Zarqawi despite its declaration of jihad against Shi'ite Muslims. He claimed that German and Italian court documents showed Zarqawi created a European terrorist network while based in Tehran.

Ledeen was a board member of the "Coalition for Democracy in Iran" (CDI), founded by Morris Amitay, a former executive director of American Israel Public Affairs Committee (AIPAC). Ledeen had also been part of the board of the U.S. Committee for a Free Lebanon. According to The Washington Post, quoted by Asia Times, he was the only full-time international affairs analyst regularly consulted by Karl Rove, George W. Bush's closest advisor.

Following the February 2003 speech by French Minister for Foreign Affairs Dominique de Villepin at the United Nations General Assembly against the intervention in Iraq, Ledeen outlined, in a column entitled "A Theory," a possibility that France and Germany, both NATO allies of the United States, "struck a deal with radical Islam and with radical Arabs" to use "extremism and terrorism as the weapon of choice" to weaken the United States. He stated, "It sounds fanciful, to be sure," but that, "If this is correct, we will have to pursue the war against terror far beyond the boundaries of the Middle East, into the heart of Western Europe. And there, as in the Middle East, our greatest weapons are political: the demonstrated desire for freedom of the peoples of the countries that oppose us."

Jonah Goldberg, Ledeen's colleague at National Review, coined the term "Ledeen Doctrine" in a 2002 column. This tongue-in-cheek "doctrine" is usually summarized as "Every ten years or so, the United States needs to pick up some small crappy little country and throw it against the wall, just to show the world we mean business," which Goldberg remembered Ledeen saying in an early 1990s speech.

Ledeen has also advocated that U.S. leaders take a stronger rhetorical stance in wars on Islamic regimes and militant groups. For instance he has recommended in public talks that U.S. leaders question or challenge defeated Islamic militaries or forces regarding the apparent failure of Allah to assure their victory.

Personal life
Ledeen was born in Los Angeles, California.

Ledeen is an accomplished contract bridge player. He has also partnered Jimmy Cayne, who was the oldest CEO on Wall Street when he oversaw the collapse of Bear Stearns firm in 2007 and 2008. Consulted by a New York Times journalist early in the episode, Ledeen suggested that his book on the leadership lessons of Machiavelli had influenced Cayne, and observed that "Jimmy saw himself in Machiavelli ... you have to get rid of failure and you have to punish lack of virtue ruthlessly and all the time."

His first wife was Jenny Ledeen of St. Louis, Mo. Ledeen has three children: Simone, Gabriel, and Daniel. Simone has worked both in Iraq and Afghanistan for the Department of Defense; Gabriel is currently a lieutenant in the United States Marines Corps serving his second tour in Iraq; Daniel too is currently a lieutenant in the USMC.

He is married to his second wife, Barbara, who was a longtime staffer for Senator Chuck Grassley on the Senate Judiciary Committee until early 2021, when she retired from the Senate.

Missing Clinton emails
Barbara Ledeen sparked controversy in 2015 when she tried to launch her own investigation into Hillary Clinton's emails, while a staffer for Senator Chuck Grassley on the Senate Judiciary Committee which was looking into Trump's Russia issue. According to FBI notes, she requested the assistance of both a defense contractor and Newt Gingrich who asked Judicial Watch for financial assistance for her efforts. Judicial Watch requested another contractor to access the "deep web and dark web". Matt Tate, a former British intelligence official, was approached by Peter W. Smith, an aid close to Gingrich and who was also working with Michael Flynn who is a confidant of Barbara Ledeen's husband, who Tate said Smith was obtaining Clinton's emails independently of Barbara Ledeen's efforts which Grassley had told her to stop.

Project Veritas
To support Project Veritas in 2017 and 2018 and while she was a staff member on the Chuck Grassley led Senate Judiciary Committee, Barbara Ledeen was tasked to help discredit H.R. McMaster because he had stated that President Trump had the intelligence of a "kindergartner" and was an "idiot." She posted numerous comments on Facebook supporting Project Veritas including "We owe a lot to Erik Prince" because of his efforts to support Project Veritas and many disparaging posts about McMaster. Her involvement in the campaign to discredit McMaster led to Barbara Ledeen being named as a member of the Groundswell group; she admitted passing on information to Project Veritas but said "I am not part of a plot."

Bibliography
 Universal Fascism; the Theory and Practice of the Fascist International, 1928–1936, New York, H. Fertig, 1972
 co-written with Renzo De Felice: Fascism: An Informal Introduction To Its Theory And Practice, New Brunswick, N.J. : Transaction Books, 1976 .
 "Renzo De Felice and the Controversy over Italian Fascism", pages 269–283 from Journal of Contemporary History, Volume 11, 1976.
 The First Duce: D'Annunzio at Fiume, Baltimore; London: Johns Hopkins University Press, 1977 .
 Italy In Crisis, Beverly Hills [Calif.]: Sage publications, 1977 .
 co-written with George Mosse: Intervista sul Nazismo, Rome-Bari, Laterza, 1977
 co-written with William Lewis: Debacle, The American Failure in Iran, Vintage Books; 1st Vintage Books ed edition (1982) 
 Grave New World, New York: Oxford University Press, 1985 .
 West European Communism and American Foreign Policy, New Brunswick, N.J., U.S.A.: Transaction Books, 1987 .
 Perilous Statecraft: An Insider's Account of the Iran-Contra Affair, New York: Scribner, 1988 .
 Superpower Dilemmas: the U.S. and the U.S.S.R. at Century's End, New Brunswick, U.S.A.: Transaction Publishers, 1992 .
 Freedom Betrayed: How America Led a Global Democratic Revolution, Won the Cold War, and Walked Away, Washington, D.C.: AEI Press, 1996 .
 Machiavelli on Modern Leadership: Why Machiavelli's Iron Rules Are As Timely and Important Today as Five Centuries Ago, New York: Truman Talley Books/St. Martin's Press, 1999 .
 The War against The Terror Masters: Why It Happened, Where We Are Now, How We'll Win, New York: St. Martin's Press, 2002 .
 The Iranian Time Bomb: The Mullah Zealots' Quest for Destruction. Truman Talley Books, 2007. . .
 Obama's Betrayal of Israel, New York: Encounter Broadsides, 2010 
 The Field of Fight: How We Can Win the Global War Against Radical Islam and Its Allies co-written with Lt. General Michael T. Flynn, New York: St. Martin's Press, 2016 .

See also
Timeline of Russian interference in the 2016 United States elections
Timeline of Russian interference in the 2016 United States elections (July 2016 – election day)

Notes

References

External links
 Profile at International Analyst Network
 
 
 

1941 births
Living people
Historians of fascism
Iran–Contra affair
Writers from Los Angeles
University of Wisconsin–Madison College of Letters and Science alumni
Washington University in St. Louis faculty
The American Spectator people
American conspiracy theorists
American contract bridge players
Neoconservatism
New Right (United States)